Oberschütze was a German military rank first used in the Bavarian Army of the late 19th century.

Usage 
The rank and its equivalents (Oberkanonier, Oberpionier etc.) was in generally introduced into the German Reichswehr from circa 1920 and continued use in its successor, the Wehrmacht until 1945, with exception of the period from October 1934 to October 1936 where no promotions to this rank took place. In Nazi Germany's Kriegsmarine (navy) there was no equivalent for this particular rank grade. The use of Oberschütze and its equivalents reached its height during the Second World War when the Wehrmacht maintained the rank in both the German Army (Heer) and the ground forces branch of the air force (Luftwaffe).

The rank of Oberschütze and its specific unit type equivalents (Oberkanonier, Obergrenadier from 1942, Oberpionier, Oberfahrer, Oberfunker etc.) was created to give recognition and rank promotion to those enlisted soldiers who had achieved or displayed an above-average aptitude and proficiency but would not, however, qualify for promotion to the Gefreiter rank. A consideration for promotion to the rank of Oberschütze could usually be achieved after six months to one year of military service.

In the militaries of other nations, Oberschütze was considered the equivalent of a private first class.

See also 
 Table of ranks and insignia of the Waffen-SS
 Original German: SS-Oberschütze

Notes

Bibliography 

 
 

Military ranks of Germany
SS ranks